Esin Hakaj (born 12 December 1996) is an Albanian professional footballer who plays as a left-back for Vllaznia Shkodër in the Albanian Superliga.

Career

Vllaznia
Hake began his career with local side Vllaznia Shkodër, where he progressed through the academy before being promoted to the first team during 2014–15 winter break, and he was an unused substitute in an Albanian Superliga game against FK Kukësi on 24 January 2015 in a 2–1 loss. He made his professional debut the following week on 31 January against Teuta Durrës where he started the game, received a yellow card and was subsisted off in the 89th minute for Arsen Hajdari in the 2–1 loss for his side. In total he made 5 league and 1 Albanian Cup appearance during the 2014–15 campaign before becoming a regular squad member the following season as he made 23 league appearances, including 9 starts.

International career
Hakaj was called up for the first time in international level at the Albania national under-21 football team by coach Skënder Gega in an Albanian Superliga selection to participate in a 3-days mini preparatory stage in Durrës, Albania from 22–25 February 2015.

He was called up by coach Redi Jupi in two occasions for the 2017 UEFA European Under-21 Championship qualification, first against Hungary U21 on 13 October 2015 and then against Greece U21 and Hungary U21 on 24 & 28 March 2016 respectively, but however he didn't featured in any occasion.

References

1996 births
Living people
Footballers from Shkodër
Albanian footballers
Association football fullbacks
Albanian expatriate footballers
Albania youth international footballers
Albania under-21 international footballers
Albania international footballers
KF Vllaznia Shkodër players
FK Partizani Tirana players
KF Teuta Durrës players
Samsunspor footballers
Kategoria Superiore players
Kategoria e Dytë players
Albanian expatriate sportspeople in Turkey
Expatriate footballers in Turkey